Ban Senkeo  is a village in Phouvong District in the Attopu Province of south-eastern Laos.

References

Populated places in Attapeu province
Phouvong District